The name Aguadulce may refer to:

 Aguadulce, Seville, municipality in Seville.
 Aguadulce, Coclé, agricultural city and corregimiento in Panama.
 Aguadulce (Almería), town in Roquetas de Mar.